The Art Institute of California – San Diego was a for-profit art school in San Diego, California. It was briefly operated as a non-profit institution before it closed in 2019. The school was one of a number of Art Institutes, a franchise of for-profit art colleges with many branches in North America, owned and operated by Education Management Corporation. EDMC owned the college from 2000 until 2017, when, facing significant financial problems and declining enrollment, the company sold the Art Institute of California – San Diego, along with 30 other Art Institute schools, to Dream Center Education, a Los Angeles-based Pentecostal organization. Dream Center permanently closed the San Diego campus location on March 8, 2019.

History
1981: La Jolla Academy of Advertising Arts (LJAAA), later known as The Advertising Arts College (TAAC), created a new school based on the realization that most traditional college advertising or design graduates were not prepared to go to work. These graduates had acquired theoretical knowledge, but had little ability to perform hands-on tasks.
1986: The school became an accredited member of the Accrediting Commission for Career Schools and Colleges of Technology (ACCSCT).
1987: The school received approval to offer associate's and bachelor's degrees from ACCSCT and BPPVE.
2000: The Advertising Arts College (TAAC) sold to the Art Institutes system of schools located throughout North America and became known as The Art Institute of California – San Diego.
2002: The school's new  campus opens in Mission Valley, as enrollment grew to more than 800 students.
2003: Fall enrollment surpasses 1400 students in seven career-focused, creative and applied arts degree programs offered by The Art Institute.
2004: The Palette, San Diego's first culinary arts student-run dining room, opens to the public.
2019: On March 8, the San Diego campus officially closed.

References

External links
ArtInstitutes.Edu Closed School Information Page
 https://www.insidehighered.com/news/2018/12/10/dream-center-colleges-closing-years-end

California San Diego
Art schools in California
Universities and colleges in San Diego
1981 establishments in California
Educational institutions established in 1981
Educational institutions disestablished in 2019
Defunct private universities and colleges in California
Former for-profit universities and colleges in the United States